Johannes Kepler is a 1974 East German historical drama film directed by Frank Vogel and starring Reimar J. Baur, Trude Bechmann and Kurt Böwe. It is a biopic of the German astronomer and mathematician Johannes Kepler.

Cast

 Reimar J. Baur as Johannes Kepler 
 Trude Bechmann as Katharina Kepler – Mutter 
 Kurt Böwe as Tycho Brahe
 Karin Gregorek as Margarete Kepler – Schwester 
 Katharina Thalbach as Ursula Haller 
 Arno Wyzniewski as Vogt Aulber 
 Martin Trettau as Pater Paul Guldin 
 Günther Grabbert as Oswald Gabelkofer 
 Dieter Franke as Pfarrer Binder 
 Rolf Hoppe as Emperor Rudolf II. 
 Manfred Zetzsche as Ernst von Köln 
 Friedo Solter as Lucas Leyser 
 Friedrich Richter as Michael Maestlin
 Käthe Reichel as Frau Haller 
 Eva-Maria Hagen as Ursula Reinbold 'Reinboldin' 
 Barbara Dittus as Stadtwächterfrau 
 Günter Schubert as Stadtwächter 
 Gerd Ehlers as Verteidiger Rueff 
 Fred Delmare as Beutelsbacher 
 Erik S. Klein as Vogt Einhorn 
 Carl Heinz Choynski as Herr Schmidt 
 Gert Gütschow as Kammerdiener Lange 
 Hannjo Hasse as Oberkontrolleur 
 Jörg Panknin as Stadtknecht 
 Ernst Meincke as Jüngerer Stadtknecht 
 Thomas Langhoff as Dr. Jessenius 
 Hartmut Beer as Älterer Stadtknecht 
 Sadegh Shabaviz as Katholischer Hauptmann 
 Heinz Hupfer as Goldschmied 
 Mary-Edith Schreiber as Frau des Goldschmieds 
 Jan Bereska as Gerichtsknecht 
 Jörg Knochée as Gerichtsschreiber 
 Carmen-Maja Antoni as Gerichtsmagd 
 Günter Junghans as Longomontanus 
 Thomas Wolff as Tengnagel 
 Hellena Büttner as Ulla – Tychos dänische Magd 
 Karla Runkehl as Kristina Barbara Brahe – Tychos Frau 
 Sybille Schmidt as Elisabeth Brahe – Tychos Tochter 
 Werner Dissel as Richter 
 Anja Steinert as Frau Schmidt 
 Peter Hill as Schreiber von Gabelkofer 
 Axel Werner as Wächter 
 Gerd Funk as Jost Bürgi 
 Michael Gerber as Unterkontrolleur 
 Jan Spitzer as Ursinus 
 Marietta Grünwald as Schöne Frau 
 Kiril Popov as Reiteroberst 
 Jörg Gillner as Junger Jesuit 
 Wolfgang Greese as Andreas Schnabel

References

Bibliography 
 Mariana Ivanova. Cinema of Collaboration: DEFA Coproductions and International Exchange in Cold War Europe. Berghahn Books, 2019.

External links 
 

1974 films
1970s biographical drama films
1970s historical drama films
German biographical drama films
German historical drama films
East German films
1970s German-language films
Films directed by Frank Vogel
Films set in the 17th century
Biographical films about mathematicians
Biographical films about scientists
1974 drama films
1970s German films